Pierre Lapointe is the second album Canadian Québécois singer Pierre Lapointe released in 2004, after his first album in 2002 also called Pierre Lapointe being a promotional independent self-financed limited edition CD.

However this new album Pierre Lapointe is considered the major debut studio album of the artist and was released on Audiogram label in Quebec.

Titres 

 Place des Abbesses
 Le columbarium
 Debout sur ma tête
 Étoile étiolée
 Octogénaire
 Reine Émilie
 Vous
 Tel un seul homme
 Plaisirs dénudés
 Paradis des billes
 Pointant le nord
 Hyacinthe la jolie suivie de Maman vers 26 minutes

Personnel 

Piano: Pierre Lapointe
Guitar: Philippe Bergeron, Benoît Charest (Le Columbarium)
Double Bass: Éric Auclair
Slide Bass: Yves Desrosiers
Drums: Justin Allard and Tony Albino
Harp: Caroline Lizotte
Trumpet: Charles Imbeau
Trombone: Marc Fortin
Clarinet, Piccolo, Ukulele: Jean-Denis Levasseur
Violin: Marie-Soleil Bélanger
Cello: Sheila Hannigan
Piano, Guitar, etc.: Jean Massicotte

2004 albums
Pierre Lapointe albums